Briant may refer to:
 Places
 Briant, Saône-et-Loire, a commune in the region of Bourgogne in eastern France

 People
 Alexander Briant (1556–1581), an English Jesuit and martyr, executed at Tyburn
 Frank Briant (1863–1934), a British Liberal politician and Civil Servant
 Gavin Briant (born 1969), a former Zimbabwean cricket player
 George Briant (1828-1914), an Australian cricket player
 George (1901-2005) and Germaine Briant (1903-2005), an American couple married for 83 years
 Michael E. Briant (born 1942), a British television director
 Pierre Briant (born 1940), a French Iranologist, Professor of History and Civilisation of the Achaemenid World
 Shane Briant (1946–2021), an English actor and novelist
 Vincent Briant (born 1986), a French professional football player

See also
 Briand (disambiguation)
 Bryant (disambiguation)